This is a list of 130 species in Chrysolina, a genus of leaf beetles in the family Chrysomelidae.

Chrysolina species

 Chrysolina affinis (Fabricius, 1787) g
 Chrysolina americana (Linnaeus, 1758) g
 Chrysolina analis (Linnaeus, 1767) g
 Chrysolina atrovirens (Frivaldszky, 1876) g
 Chrysolina aurichalcea (Mannerheim, 1825) g
 Chrysolina auripennis (Say, 1824) i c g b
 Chrysolina baetica (Suffrian, 1851) g
 Chrysolina bankii (Fabricius, 1775) g b
 Chrysolina banksi Fabricius g
 Chrysolina basilaris (Say, 1824) i c g b
 Chrysolina brunsvicensis (Gravenhorst, 1807) g
 Chrysolina carnifex (Fabricius, 1792) g
 Chrysolina carpathica (Fuss, 1856) g
 Chrysolina caurina Brown, 1962 i c g
 Chrysolina cavigera (Sahlberg, 1885) i c g
 Chrysolina cerealis (Linnaeus, 1767) g
 Chrysolina chalcites (Germar, 1824) g
 Chrysolina cinctipennis (Harold, 1874) g
 Chrysolina coerulans (Scriba, 1791) g
 Chrysolina colasi (Cobos, 1952) g
 Chrysolina corcyria (Suffrian, 1851) g
 Chrysolina costalis (Olivier, 1807) g
 Chrysolina cretica (Olivier, 1807) g
 Chrysolina cribaria (Rogers, 1856) i c g
 Chrysolina cribrosa (Ahrens, 1812) g
 Chrysolina cuiae Ge & Daccordi g
 Chrysolina cuprina (Duftschmid, 1825) g
 Chrysolina curvilinea (Weise, 1884) g
 Chrysolina deubeli (Ganglbauer, 1897) g
 Chrysolina didymata (Scriba, 1791) g
 Chrysolina diluta (Germar, 1824) g
 Chrysolina eurina (Frivaldszky, 1883) g
 Chrysolina extorris Brown, 1962 i c g
 Chrysolina fastuosa (Scopoli, 1763) g
 Chrysolina femoralis (Olivier, 1790) g
 Chrysolina fimbrialis (Kuster, 1845) g
 Chrysolina flavomarginata (Say, 1824) i c g b
 Chrysolina fortunata (Wollaston, 1864) g
 Chrysolina fragariae (Wollaston, 1854) g
 Chrysolina geminata (Paykull, 1799) g
 Chrysolina globipennis (Suffrian, 1851) g
 Chrysolina globosa (Panzer, 1805) g
 Chrysolina graminis (Linnaeus, 1758) g
 Chrysolina grancanariensis (Lindberg, 1953) g
 Chrysolina grossa (Fabricius, 1792) g
 Chrysolina gyacaensis Daccordi & Yang g
 Chrysolina gypsophilae (Küster, 1845) g
 Chrysolina haemoptera (Stephens) g
 Chrysolina halysa Bechyne, 1950 g
 Chrysolina helopioides (Suffrian, 1851) g
 Chrysolina herbacea (Duftschmid, 1825) g
 Chrysolina hohxilensis Daccordi & Ge g
 Chrysolina hongyuanensis Daccordi & Ge g
 Chrysolina hudsonica Brown, 1938 i c g
 Chrysolina hyperici (Forster, 1771) i c g b  (St. Johns wort leaf beetle)
 Chrysolina hyrcana (Weise, 1884) g
 Chrysolina inflata (Weise, 1916) g
 Chrysolina inornata (Rogers, 1856) i c g
 Chrysolina interstincta (Suffrian, 1851) g
 Chrysolina jenisseiensis (Breit, 1920) g
 Chrysolina kuesteri (Helliesen, 1911) g
 Chrysolina laeviguttata Chujo, 1958 g
 Chrysolina latecincta (Demaison, 1896) g
 Chrysolina lepida (Olivier, 1807) g
 Chrysolina lichenis (Richter, 1820) g
 Chrysolina limbata (Fabricius, 1775) g
 Chrysolina lucida (Olivier, 1807) g
 Chrysolina lucidicollis (Küster, 1845) g
 Chrysolina lutea (Petagna, 1819) g
 Chrysolina mactata (Fairmaire, 1859) g
 Chrysolina magniceps (J.R.Sahlberg, 1885) g
 Chrysolina marcasitica (Germar, 1824) g
 Chrysolina marginata (Linnaeus, 1758) i c g b
 Chrysolina markamensis Daccordi & Ge g
 Chrysolina milleri (Weise, 1884) g
 Chrysolina obenbergeri Bechyne, 1950 g
 Chrysolina obscurella (Suffrian, 1851) g
 Chrysolina obsoleta (Brulle, 1838) g
 Chrysolina oceanoripensis Bourdonné, Doguet & Petitpierre, 2013 g
 Chrysolina ohoi Chujo, 1958 g
 Chrysolina olivieri (Bedel, 1892) g
 Chrysolina oricalcia (Müller, 1776) g
 Chrysolina orientalis (Olivier, 1807) g
 Chrysolina osellai (Daccordi & Ruffo, 1979) g
 Chrysolina peregrina (Herrich-Schäffer, 1838) g
 Chrysolina petitpierrei Kippenberg, 2004 g
 Chrysolina philotesia Daccordi & Ruffo, 1980 g
 Chrysolina platypoda (Bechyné, 1950) g
 Chrysolina platyscelidina (Jacobson, 1898) g
 Chrysolina pliginskii (Reitter, 1913) g
 Chrysolina polita (Linnaeus, 1758) g
 Chrysolina pourtoyi Bourdonné, 1997 g
 Chrysolina pseudolurida (Roubal, 1917) g
 Chrysolina purpurascens (Germar, 1822) g
 Chrysolina quadrigemina (Suffrian, 1851) i c g b  (klamath weed beetle)
 Chrysolina reitteri (Weise, 1884) g
 Chrysolina relucens (Rosenhauer, 1847) g
 Chrysolina rhodia Bechyne, 1950 g
 Chrysolina rossia (Illiger, 1802) g
 Chrysolina rufa (Duftschmid, 1825) g
 Chrysolina rufoaenea (Suffrian, 1851) g
 Chrysolina sahlbergi (Menetries, 1832) g
 Chrysolina salviae (Germar, 1824) g
 Chrysolina sanguinolenta (Linnaeus, 1758) g
 Chrysolina schaefferi Brown, 1962 i c g b
 Chrysolina schatzmayri (Muller, 1916) g
 Chrysolina schneideri (Weise, 1882) g
 Chrysolina septentrionalis (Ménétriés, 1851) g b
 Chrysolina shuyongi Ge & Daccordi g
 Chrysolina stachydis (Gené, 1839) g
 Chrysolina staphylaea (Linnaeus, 1758) i c g b  (brown mint leaf beetle)
 Chrysolina sturmi (Westhoff, 1882) g
 Chrysolina substrangulata Bourdonne, 1986 g
 Chrysolina subsulcata (Mannerheim, 1853) i c g b
 Chrysolina suffriani (Fairmaire, 1859) g
 Chrysolina susterai Bechyne, 1950 g
 Chrysolina tagana (Suffrian, 1851) g
 Chrysolina taygetana Bechyne, 1952 g
 Chrysolina timarchoides (Brisout de Barneville, 1883) g
 Chrysolina turca (Fairmaire, 1865) g
 Chrysolina umbratilis (Weise, 1887) g
 Chrysolina varians (Schaller, 1783) i c g b  (St. John's wort beetle)
 Chrysolina variolosa (Petagna, 1819) g
 Chrysolina vernalis (Brullé, 1832) g
 Chrysolina viridana (Küster, 1844) g
 Chrysolina weisei (Frivaldszky, 1883) g
 Chrysolina wollastoni Bechyne, 1957 g
 Chrysolina wollosowiczi (Jacobson, 1910) i c g
 Chrysolina zhangi Ge & Daccordi g

Data sources: i = ITIS, c = Catalogue of Life, g = GBIF, b = Bugguide.net

References

Chrysolina